Benny Powell (March 1, 1930 – June 26, 2010) was an American jazz trombonist. He played both standard (tenor) trombone and bass trombone.

Biography 
Born Benjamin Gordon Powell Jr in New Orleans, Louisiana, he first played professionally at the age of 14, and at 18 began playing with Lionel Hampton. In 1951 he left Hampton's band and began playing with Count Basie, in whose orchestra he would remain until 1963. Powell takes the trombone solo in the bridge of Basie's 1955 recording of "April in Paris".

After leaving Basie, he freelanced in New York City. From 1966 to 1970 he was a member of the Thad Jones-Mel Lewis Jazz Orchestra, playing on Monday nights at the Village Vanguard. Among other engagements, he played in the house band of the Merv Griffin Show, and when the show moved to Los Angeles, California, in 1970 Powell also relocated there. He did extensive work as a session musician, including with Abdullah Ibrahim, John Carter, and Randy Weston. Later in his career Powell worked as an educator, including as part of the Jazzmobile project. Having moved back to New York in the 1980s, he began teaching at the New School for Jazz and Contemporary Music in 1994.

He died in a Manhattan hospital at the age of 80, following back surgery.

Personal 
Powell married Evelyn Jackson at St Bernard Catholic Church in New York in 1958.

Discography

As leader
 Coast to Coast (Trident, 1982)
 The Gift of Love (Faith, 2003)
 Nextep (Origin, 2008)

As sideman
With Pepper Adams
 Pepper Adams Plays the Compositions of Charlie Mingus (Workshop Jazz, 1964)
With Gene Ammons
 Free Again (Prestige, 1971)
With Count Basie
 The Count! (Clef, 1952 [1955])
 Basie Jazz (Clef, 1952 [1954])
 Dance Session (Clef, 1953)
 Dance Session Album #2 (Clef, 1954)
 Basie (Clef, 1954)
 Count Basie Swings, Joe Williams Sings (Clef, 1955) with Joe Williams
 April in Paris (Verve, 1956)
 The Greatest!! Count Basie Plays, Joe Williams Sings Standards with Joe Williams
 Metronome All-Stars 1956 (Clef, 1956) with Ella Fitzgerald and Joe Williams
 Hall of Fame (Verve, 1956 [1959])
 Basie in London (Verve, 1956)
 One O'Clock Jump (Verve, 1957) with Joe Williams and Ella Fitzgerald
 Count Basie at Newport (Verve, 1957)
 The Atomic Mr. Basie (Roulette, 1957) aka Basie and E=MC2
 Basie Plays Hefti (Roulette, 1958)
 Sing Along with Basie (Roulette, 1958) with Joe Williams and Lambert, Hendricks & Ross
 Basie One More Time (Roulette, 1959)
 Breakfast Dance and Barbecue (Roulette, 1959)
 Everyday I Have the Blues (Roulette, 1959) - with Joe Williams
 Dance Along with Basie (Roulette, 1959)
 String Along with Basie (Roulette, 1960)
 Not Now, I'll Tell You When (Roulette, 1960)
 The Count Basie Story (Roulette, 1960)
 Kansas City Suite (Roulette, 1960)
 The Legend (Roulette, 1961)
 Back with Basie (Roulette, 1962)
 Basie in Sweden (Roulette, 1962)
 On My Way & Shoutin' Again! (Verve, 1962)
 This Time by Basie! (Reprise, 1963)
 More Hits of the 50's and 60's (Verve, 1963)
With Donald Byrd
 Jazz Lab (Columbia, 1957) with Gigi Gryce
With Benny Carter
Harlem Renaissance (MusicMasters, 1992)
With John Carter
 Castles of Ghana (Gramavision, 1986)
 Dance of the Love Ghosts (Gramavision, 1987)
 Fields (Gramavision, 1988)
 Shadows on a Wall [Gramavision, 1989)
With Buck Clayton
 How Hi the Fi (Columbia, 1954)
With Hank Crawford
 Mr. Blues Plays Lady Soul (Atlantic, 1969)
With Frank Foster
No 'Count (Savoy, 1956)
With Al Grey
 The Last of the Big Plungers (Argo, 1959)
 The Thinking Man’s Trombone (Argo, 1960)
With Eddie Harris
 Silver Cycles (Atlantic, 1968)
 How Can You Live Like That? (Atlantic, 1976)
With Jimmy Heath
 New Picture (Landmark, 1985)
 Little Man Big Band (Verve, 1992)
With Johnny Hodges
 Triple Play (RCA Victor, 1967)
With J. J. Johnson
 The Total J.J. Johnson (RCA Victor, 1967)
With Philly Joe Jones Dameronia
 Look Stop Listen (Uptown, 1983)
With Clifford Jordan
 Play What You Feel (Mapleshade, 1990 [1997])
With Bobby Bland and B.B. King
 Bobby Bland and B. B. King Together Again...Live (MCA, 1976)
with Melba Liston
 Melba Liston and Her 'Bones (MetroJazz, 1958)
With Herbie Mann
 Glory of Love (CTI, 1967)
With Les McCann
 Comment (Atlantic, 1970)
With David Newman
 Bigger & Better (Atlantic, 1968)
 The Many Facets of David Newman (Atlantic, 1969)
Cityscape (HighNote, 2006)
With Joe Newman
 The Count's Men (Jazztone, 1955)
 Salute to Satch (RCA Victor, 1956)
With Chico O'Farrill
 Nine Flags (Impulse!, 1966)
With Moacir Santos
 Saudade (Blue Note, 1974)
With Frank Wess
 North, South, East....Wess (Savoy 1956)
With Randy Weston
 Spirits of Our Ancestors (recorded 1991)
 Volcano Blues (recorded 1993)
 Saga (recorded 1995)
 Khepera (recorded 1998)
 Spirit! The Power of Music (recorded 1999)
 Live in St. Lucia (recorded 2002)
With Gerald Wilson
 New York, New Sound (Mack Avenue, 2003)
 In My Time (Mack Avenue, 2005)

References

American jazz trombonists
Male trombonists
1930 births
2010 deaths
Jazz musicians from New Orleans
American male jazz musicians
Dameronia members
The Capp-Pierce Juggernaut members
Statesmen of Jazz members